is a Japanese voice actress from Chiba Prefecture, Japan.

Biography

Filmography

Anime
Hoshin Engi (1999 TV series), Likouha
Fruits Basket (2001 TV series), Girl
Happy World! (2002 OVA), Motoko
Happy Lesson (2002 TV series), Satsuki Gokajo
Tokyo Underground (2002, TV series), Tail Ashford
Sister Princess: Re Pure (2002 TV series), Jiiya
Moekan (2003–2004, OVA), 隷 
True Love Story (2003 OVA), Kiriya Satomi
Happy Lesson Advance (2003 TV series), Satsuki Gokajo
Saiyuki Reload (2003 TV series) Kouryu
Shadow Star: Mukuro Naru Hoshi Tama Taru Ko (2003 TV series), Natsuki Honda
 Raimuiro Senkitan (2003 TV series), Asa Katou, Theme Song Performance
 Raimuiro Senkitan: The South Island Dream Romantic Adventure (2004 OVA), Asa Katou, Theme Song Performance
Happy Lesson The Final (2004 OVA), Satsuki Gokajo
Hit o Nerae! (2004, TV series) Kazumi Hayakawa
Saiyuki Gunlock (2004 TV series) Kouryu
Daphne in the Brilliant Blue (2004 TV series), Rosemary
Gantz (2004 TV series), Mika Kanda
Major (2004 TV series)Ryota Sawamura
 Akahori Gedou Hour Rabuge (2005 TV series), Kaoruko Sajima
 Zettai Seigi Love Pheromone (2005 TV series), Kaoruko Sajima
Hininden Gausu (2005 OVA), Kaese
Kidō Shinsengumi Moeyo Ken (2005 TV series) Kiyomi Watase
MÄR (2005-2007 TV series), Pluto
Bakkyuu HIT! Crash Bedaman (2006 TV series), Hitto Tamaga
Kagihime Monogatari Eikyū Alice Rondo (TV series 2006), Jack Jacqueline
Musashi Gundoh (2006 TV series), Toyotomi Hideyori
Saiunkoku Monogatari (2006 TV series), Yōshun
GeGeGe no Kitaro (2007, TV series), Hanako
Saiyuki Reload: Burial (2007 OVA), Kouryu
Net Ghost PiPoPa (2008, TV series), Mamoru Shindo
Spice and Wolf II (2009 TV series), Lant
Level E (2011 TV series), Taiyo Akagawa
The Knight in the Area (2012 TV series), Misaki Hanai

Dubbing

Live-action
21 Bridges as Frankie Burns (Sienna Miller)
Boiling Point as Carly (Vinette Robinson)
Heidi as Peter (Quirin Agrippi)
Help, I Shrunk My Parents as Hulda Stechbarth (Andrea Sawatzki)
The Lobster as The Maid (Ariane Labed)
Love Beats Rhymes as Coco Ford (Azealia Banks)
Mal-Mo-E: The Secret Mission as Goo Ja-young (Kim Sun-young)
Mr. Moll and the Chocolate Factory as Jackie (Lou Vogel)
Peaceful as Eugénie (Cécile de France)

Video games
Dixie Kong, since Mario Superstar Baseball (2005)

Animation
Marona's Fantastic Tale as Istvan's Mother
The Owl House as Eda Clawthorne
X-Men: Evolution as Amanda Sefton

Singles and albums
トゥルーラブストーリー Summer days, and yet ... プレキャラクターシリーズ Vol．2 桐屋里未 Mai 2, 2003
HAPPY☆LESSON｢直球ヴィーナス｣(五箇条さつき)October 23, 2002
 released on December 25, 2002, and ranked 131st in Oricon singles charts.
 image song album of the eponymous character released on May 7, 2003.
さりげないきずな released on December 10, 2003

References

External links

Living people
Arts Vision voice actors
Japanese video game actresses
Japanese voice actresses
Voice actresses from Chiba Prefecture
20th-century Japanese actresses
21st-century Japanese actresses
Year of birth missing (living people)